Cypraecassis wilmae is a species of large sea snail, a marine gastropod mollusk in the family Cassidae, the helmet snails and bonnet snails.

Description

Distribution

References

External links

Cassidae
Gastropods described in 2000